The Aspria Tennis Cup (formerly Zenith Tennis Cup) is a professional tennis tournament played on outdoor red clay courts. It is currently part of the Association of Tennis Professionals (ATP) Challenger Tour. It is held annually at the Harbour Club Milano in Milan, Italy, since 2006.

Past finals

Singles

Doubles

External links

 
ATP Challenger Tour
Clay court tennis tournaments
Tennis tournaments in Italy